Philip Yorke, Viscount Royston (7 May 1784 – 7 April 1808), was a British traveller and politician.

Yorke was the eldest son of Philip Yorke, 3rd Earl of Hardwicke and Lady Elizabeth, daughter of James Lindsay, 5th Earl of Balcarres. He was the grandson of Charles Yorke and the nephew of Charles Philip Yorke and Sir Joseph Sydney Yorke. He was educated at Harrow School and St John's College, Cambridge, where he graduated as Master of Arts in 1803. At Cambridge he wrote a translation of Lycophron's poem about Cassandra that was praised highly by Richard Porson. In 1806 he embarked on a tour of the Russian Empire which he described in detail in letters to his father that were published in The remains of the late Lord Viscount Royston: With a memoir of his life by the Rev. Henry Pepys (London: J. Murray, 1838); they were used by Lydia Davis for her story "Lord Royston's Tour."

He was returned to parliament for Reigate in 1806, a seat he held until April 1808, when he was lost in a storm off Memel in a ship called the Agatha of Lübeck.

Yorke died aged only 23, predeceasing his father. He never married. His younger brother Charles also died before his father and their cousin Charles Yorke eventually succeeded in the earldom. His translation of Lycophron was published posthumously.

References

External links 
 

1784 births
1808 deaths
People educated at Harrow School
Alumni of St John's College, Cambridge
Heirs apparent who never acceded
British courtesy viscounts
Philip
Members of the Parliament of the United Kingdom for English constituencies
UK MPs 1806–1807
UK MPs 1807–1812
Deaths due to shipwreck at sea